The Great Britain women's national basketball team represents Great Britain in international women's basketball. The current governing body for the Great Britain team was formed by the national basketball organisations of England (Basketball England), Scotland (Basketball Scotland) and Wales (Basketball Wales) on 1 December 2005 in order to provide a competitive team for international competition. This structure does not include the basketball association of Northern Ireland; Northern Irish players normally represent the Ireland women's national basketball team, though they are also eligible to compete for Great Britain and Northern Ireland at the Olympic Games.

Tournament record

Summer Olympics
2012 – 11th place

EuroBasket
2011 – 9th place
2013 – 9th place
2015 – 20th place
2019 – 4th place
2023 – Qualified

Current roster
Roster for the FIBA Women's EuroBasket 2019.

|}
| valign="top" |
 Head coach

 Assistant coaches

Legend
Club – describes lastclub before the tournament
Age – describes ageon 27 June 2019
|}

References

External links

FIBA profile

 
 
Women's national basketball teams